The Rottenbuch Radio Tower is a transmitting tower of the Vodafone company, sited between Peiting and Rottenbuch in southern Bavaria, Germany.

The framework tower, a glued girder binder construction made from European Douglas fir timber, is 66 meters high. The structure is held together by steel pegs.

On 18 March 2002 tower construction was started with the excavation of the tower foundations; on 3 June 2002 building of the tower structure began. For this the lower elements of the framework construction were pre-assembled in pairs and then put in place. The missing diagonal elements were then added afterwards. On 21 June 2002 the construction was finished. At this time, the Rottenbuch Radio Tower was the highest wooden tower in Germany (and continued being this until in 2012, the Windkraftanlage Hannover-Marienwerder (a wind power station in Hanover) with a 100m high wooden tower was erected).

As of July 2020, a newspaper report says that the tower has to be demolished due to irreparable damage by ants. A replacement tower is planned to be erected until 2022, but as of July 2020 it is not decided whether this will be a wooden building again.

See also
List of towers

References

Communication towers in Germany
Buildings and structures in Weilheim-Schongau
Radio masts and towers in Germany
Wooden towers
Vodafone buildings and structures
Towers completed in 2002
2002 establishments in Germany